Okoličná na Ostrove (Hungarian pronunciation:) is a village and municipality in the Komárno District in the Nitra Region of south-west Slovakia.

Geography
The village lies at an altitude of 113 metres and covers an area of 29.89 km².
It has a population of 1435 people.

History
In the 9th century, the territory of Okoličná na Ostrove became part of the Kingdom of Hungary. In historical records the village was first mentioned in 1229.
After the Austro-Hungarian army disintegrated in November 1918, Czechoslovak troops occupied the area, later acknowledged internationally by the Treaty of Trianon. Between 1938 and 1945 Okoličná na Ostrove once more  became part of Miklós Horthy's Hungary through the First Vienna Award. From 1945 until the Velvet Divorce, it was part of Czechoslovakia. Since then it has been part of Slovakia.

Demographics
The village is about 89% Hungarian, and 11% Slovak.

Facilities
The village has a public library a gym and 3 football pitches.

Villages and municipalities in the Komárno District
Hungarian communities in Slovakia